"This Is It" is a 1976 disco song written by Van McCoy, and performed by American singer and actress Melba Moore for her fifth album of the same name (1976).

Background
Melba Moore would give credit to her husband/manager Charles Huggins, whom she married in September 1974, with getting her signed to Buddah Records in 1975 - ending a four-year recording studio absence - , and with arranging for veteran soul music songwriter/producer Van McCoy to helm Moore's second Buddah album release, which she began recording in January 1976. The recruitment of McCoy to helm Moore's album was essentially due to McCoy's success as a producer of disco records, it being hoped that a disco hit would consolidate the somewhat nebulous success Moore had to that point experienced as a recording artist: (Melba Moore quote:)"I just couldn't ignore the [impact] that disco was having on music".

The album's disco-oriented title track was released in March 1976 and became a discothèque favorite: while the "This Is It" single did afford Moore her first major R&B hit, reaching No. 18 on the Billboard ranking of R&B singles the track failed to provide her with the desired Pop music breakout, rising no higher than No. 91 on the Billboard Hot 100 ("This Is It" did become a Top Ten hit on the singles chart for the United Kingdom).

Charts

Dannii Minogue version

"This Is It" was covered in 1993 by Australian singer Dannii Minogue on her second album, Get into You (1993). The song was produced by Tim Lever and Mike Percy and received a mixed reception from music critics.

Release
"This Is It" was released as the album's third single on July 5, 1993, in the United Kingdom. The song reached the top 10 on the UK Singles Chart, becoming Minogue's third top-10 single. In Australia, it reached the top 20 and became an airplay hit earning a gold certification. Despite missing the top 10, the single spent twenty weeks in the ARIA top 50 and was the forty-third highest selling single of the year, the third-highest for an Australian artist. Along with the single "Get into You", the song was chosen to be released in Canada and the USA.  The single was also featured in the second volume of the Dance Mix USA series, which used the "Dannii Got Murked" remix. This version of the song was used by Network Ten in their idents.

Critical reception
Larry Flick from Billboard wrote, "Vivacious and charming Minogue takes another stab at transferring her European success to the States with an earnest reading of a disco nugget made famous by Melba Moore. She skips and spins atop a throbbing beat foundation, swerving around a flurry of chirping background vocals, grand piano lines, and fluttering strings." Caroline Sullivan from The Guardian said in her review of the Get into You album, "Two seventies covers, Melba Moore's "This Is It" and an authoritative take on the Jacksons' "Show You the Way to Go", are the big moments, all clattering drum machines and Barry White-ish swooning strings."

In his weekly UK chart commentary, James Masterton noted that Dannii's last UK Top 10 hit was her cover of "Jump to the Beat", adding that it "may bode well for this cover". A reviewer from Music & Media commented, "Little sister is wearing big sister's clothes, and they are tight fit for the first time with this cheerful pop/dance song". Alan Jones from Music Week gave the song three out of five, describing it as a "house-inflicted but otherwise faithful remake" and a "typically breezy Minogue single". He felt that "the chart is overloaded with disco-era remakes, so it's hard to see it matching Moore's number nine peak."

Music video
The accompanying music video for the song was filmed in Los Angeles and was directed by Willy Smax. It features Minogue and her then-boyfriend actor Julian McMahon on a beach. The dance routine in the video was choreographed by Minogue. It also features an appearance from American actress Elise Neal, who later starred in the horror movie Scream 2 alongside Neve Campbell and the Lifetime made-for-television movie Aaliyah: The Princess of R&B in the role of Gladys Knight. It was listed in NME's "50 Worst Music Videos".

Track listings and formats

 Australian CD single (D11390)
 "This Is It" (7-inch version)
 "This Is It" (12-inch extended version)
 "This Is It" (alternative 12-inch mix)
 "This Is It" (Dannii Got Murked mix)
 "This Is It" (Miami Heat mix)
 "This Is It" (One World 12-inch mix)
 "This Is It" (a capella version)

 Australian cassette single (C11390)
 "This Is It"
 "It's Time to Move On"

 CD single
"This Is It" (7-inch version)
"This Is It" (12-inch extended version)
"This Is It" (alternative 12-inch mix)
"This Is It" (Dannii Got Murked mix)
"This Is It" (Miami Heat mix)This Is It (One World 12-inch mix)
"This Is It" (a capella version)

 UK vinyl single
"This Is It" (Dannii Got Murked mix)
"This Is It" (12-inch extended version)
"This Is It" (Miami Heat mix)This Is It (Vapour Rub dub)
"This Is It" (a cappella version)

 North American CD single
"This Is It" (Dannii Got Murked mix)
"This Is It" (Extended version)
"This Is It" (Doc & Freestyle remix)
"This Is It" (Vapour Rub dub)
"This Is It" (alternative mix)
"This Is It" (Miami Heat mix)

 Cassette single and 7-inch vinyl
"This Is It" (7-inch version)
"It's Time to Move On"

Notes: "It's Time to Move On", was a B-side released for the Get into You album and is only found on the cassette single and 7-inch vinyl. For the North American CD, the tracks received a remaster.

Charts

Weekly charts

Year-end charts

Other covers
A Flemish-language rendering entitled "Jij En Ik" was recorded by Petra for her 1997 album Petra.

References

1976 songs
1976 singles
1993 singles
Melba Moore songs
Dannii Minogue songs
Songs written by Van McCoy
Disco songs
Buddah Records singles